Julian and Maddalo: A Conversation (1818–19) is a poem in 617 lines of enjambed heroic couplets by Percy Bysshe Shelley published posthumously in 1824.

Background
This work was penned in the autumn of 1818 at a villa called I Capuccini, in Este, near Venice, which had been lent to Shelley by his friend Lord Byron, and it was given its final revision in 1819. Shelley originally intended the poem to appear in The Examiner, a Radical paper edited by Leigh Hunt, but then decided instead on anonymous publication by Charles Ollier. This plan fell through, and Julian and Maddalo first appeared after Shelley's death in a volume of his works called Posthumous Poems in 1824 (see 1824 in poetry), edited by his widow Mary Shelley. It is inspired by conversations Shelley had with Byron in Venice in 1818, in which they explored their different outlooks on life. The bitter cynicism of Count Maddalo in the poem reflects closely Lord Byron's views, as Julian's atheism and faith in the potentialities of man does those of Shelley himself. It is written in a conversational, natural style, which had not until then been usual in Shelley's works, and which may have been partly suggested by Byron's poem Beppo. Julian and Maddalo was in its turn a strong influence on the dramatic monologues of Robert Browning.

Synopsis 

"Julian and Maddalo" is prefaced by a prose description of the main characters. Maddalo is described as a rich Venetian nobleman whose "passions and…powers are incomparably greater than those of other men; and, instead of the latter having been employed in curbing the former, they have mutually lent each other strength"; while Julian is said to be

an Englishman of good family, passionately attached to those philosophical notions which assert the power of man over his own mind, and the immense improvements of which, by the extinction of certain moral superstitions, human society may be yet susceptible…He is a complete infidel, and a scoffer at all things reputed holy.

The poem proper then begins with a depiction of the two title characters riding through a Venetian scene and discussing the subjects of religious faith, free will and progress. Julian

 Argued against despondency, but prideMade my companion take the darker side.The sense that he was greater than his kindHad struck, methinks, his eagle spirit blindBy gazing on its own exceeding light.

They then board the Count's gondola and pass a lunatic asylum, which provokes from Maddalo a comparison between the inmates' situation and the futility of all mortal life. The next day Julian visits Maddalo and meets his baby daughter (based on Byron's daughter Allegra), whose childish innocence inspires him to a statement of his own optimistic belief in the power of Good. Maddalo dismisses Julian's creed as utopian, and compares him with a former friend who has since gone mad known as the Maniac. They again take the gondola to the madhouse to meet this man, the Maniac, who tells them a confused and disconnected account of an ill-fated romance and of his abandonment by his lover. (This character has been identified by scholars as a composite of Shelley himself and the poet Tasso; the lover perhaps as Mary Shelley, whose relationship with the poet had lately been under some strain.) Julian and Maddalo are downcast by the Maniac's story, Maddalo commenting that

Most wretched menAre cradled into poetry by wrong,They learn in suffering what they teach in song.

Julian leaves Venice but, returning many years later, asks Maddalo's daughter about the madman or the Maniac and is told that his lover had returned and again left him, and that both were now dead.

Notes

External links 
 Online edition at Everypoet
Julian and Maddalo. Percy Shelley's Posthumous Poems. A Digital Edition of the 1824 Collection.
The Death of Shelley and the Birth of the Maniac: Rethinking "Julian and Maddalo". Michael Wassermann. 25 March 2011. Prezi.com.

Poetry by Percy Bysshe Shelley
1818 poems
1819 poems
Philosophical poems
Dialogues